Alain Labrousse (19 February 1937 – 6 July 2016) was a French sociologist and journalist. He specialized in Latin American politics and the geopolitics of drugs.

Biography 
He was born in Libourne in the Gironde. He studied literature in Bordeaux, then sociology at the Sorbonne. After his doctorate, he taught at the French lycée in Montevideo for five years (1965–1970), at a time when the political situation in Uruguay was growing restive. Labrousse drew on this experience to write his first work on urban guerrilla warfare, Les Tupamaros (Seuil, 1971). The book was translated in English and was published by Penguin Books as part of their Pelican Latin American Library series. It was updated in 2009, on the eve of the ascension to power of José Mujica, the former guerrilla leader.

Labrousse lived in Latin America for two decades, with a two-year break in Morocco (1969–1971).

Selected publications 
He wrote numerous books on Latin America, among them:
 with Alain Hertoghe, Le Sentier lumineux – Un nouvel intégrisme dans le tiers-monde, Paris, La Découverte, 1989, 240 p. 
Le réveil indien en Amérique latine, P.-M. Favre, 1985
Sur les chemins des Andes, à la rencontre du monde indien, Paris, L'Harmattan, 1983.
 Géopolitique et géostratégie des drogues, with Michel Koutouzis, Economica, coll. « Poche. Géopolitique », 1996
Géopolitique des drogues, Presses universitaires de France, coll. « Que sais-je ? », 2004 (note de lecture)
Dictionnaire géopolitique des drogues. La drogue dans 134 pays. Productions, trafics, conflits, usages, Éd. De Boeck
 L'Expérience chilienne : réformisme ou révolution?, Paris, 1972, Éditions du Seuil.
 with François Gèze, Argentine : révolution et contre-révolutions, Paris, 1975, Éditions du Seuil.
 Tupamaros de l'Uruguay, des armes aux urnes, Paris, 2009, Éditions du Rocher.
 Les Tupamaros. Guérilla urbaine en Uruguay, Paris, Éditions du Seuil, 1971.

References

French writers
1939 births
2016 deaths